Victorine Spears Kinloch (1885 - 1951) was an African American suffragist who lived and worked in Rhode Island, New York, and California. Her sister Charlotta Bass is well known for her civil rights activities in Los Angeles.

Biography

Victorine Spears was born in 1885 in South Carolina. Her parents were Hiram and Kate Spears, a prominent Black family in the area. She was one of eleven children, along with her sister Charlotta Bass.

She moved from South Carolina to Providence, RI, with her sister Charlotta, and they lived with her brother Ellis Spears.

Suffrage activism
In 1916, Kinloch signed the Resolution of the RI Union Colored Women's Clubs Supporting the Federal Woman Suffrage Amendment. Her signature joined those of other Black women including Mary E. Jackson.

She moved from Rhode Island to New York, New York around 1920. In New York, she worked as a dressmaker in a private shop and her husband Kinloch made cigars. She lived in New York until at least 1940. She was likely part of the NAACP, and highly involved in her community. She supported community efforts like fundraising for a Flood Relief Committee. She was part of the New Englanders club and planned or sponsored their events, and an officer of the Harlem Housewives League.

She moved to California with her son and husband, near her sister Charlotta Bass. Bass owned and operated the California Eagle, the first Black woman-owned newspaper in America. Bass did not have children and intended for her nephew John Kinloch to take over the paper when she retired. However, Kinloch died in Germany during World War II.

Marriage and children

In 1921, she married James Alexander Kinloch in New York. Their son, John Spears Kinloch, was born that same year.

Her son John Kinloch worked for his aunt Bass before he joined the military. He died in Germany on April 3, 1945, during WWII.

Death and afterward
Victorine Spears Kinloch died on October 25, 1951, in New York City.

She predeceased her son, and his remaining insurance policy passed to Charlotta Bass.

See also
African-American women's suffrage movement
Black suffrage in the United States
California Eagle
Charlotta Bass
Women's suffrage in California
Women's suffrage in Rhode Island

Further reading
Freer, R. (2004). L.A. Race Woman: Charlotta Bass and the Complexities of Black Political Development in Los Angeles. American Quarterly, 56(3), 607–632. http://www.jstor.org/stable/40068236

References

1885 births
1951 deaths
African-American suffragists
American suffragists
People from South Carolina
People from Harlem